In Bocca al Lupo is the third full-length album release by indie rock band Murder by Death. It was released on Tent Show Records, on May 23, 2006. The title comes from the Italian phrase that literally translates to "into the mouth of the wolf" and is commonly used to say "Good luck". The album is a concept album, which essentially means the songs are all connected by themes, in this case, sin and punishment.

Guitarist and lead singer, Adam Turla, explains the meaning of the first five songs on the band's website much like he did for their previous album, Who Will Survive, and What Will Be Left of Them?. The following excerpt is taken from his introduction:

Track listing

Personnel
Adam Turla – vocals, guitar
Matt Armstrong – bass
Sarah Balliet – cello, keyboards
Alex Schrodt – drums, percussion

Guest musicians
J. Robbins – backing vocals on "Dynamite Mine" and "The Big Sleep"
David A. Miller – tuba/trombone on "The Organ Grinder" and "Sometimes the Line Walks You"
Ronald Rolling – trumpet on "The Organ Grinder", "Sometimes the Line Walks You", and "The Big Sleep"
Shundra S. Johnson, Ronald Rolling, Marvin Parks, David A. Miller – choir on "The Big Sleep" and "The Devil Drives"
Janet Morgan – backing vocals on "The Big Sleep" and "The Devil Drives"

References

2006 albums
Concept albums
Murder by Death (band) albums